Anissa Chan Wong Lai Kuen is a Hong Kong educator. She served as principal of St. Paul's Co-educational College and is Chair of the Task Force on Review of School Curriculum of the Hong Kong Government.

Education
In 1980, Chan earned her bachelor's degree in science from the University of Hong Kong. She earned her master's degree in education from the University of London in 1985 and her Ph.D. in education from Monash University in 1993.

Career 
Chan was a chemistry teacher at Ying Wa Girls' School. Then, she became the principal of SKH Bishop Mok Sau Tseng Secondary School for eleven years, subsequently serving as a principal at St. Paul's Co-educational College from 2004 to 2017.

During her tenure at St. Paul's Co-educational College, she made several reforms to the school, including introducing a Rites of Passage programme in Australia, Students' Activities Week and the International Baccalaureate curriculum for senior form students.

After her retirement, she was invited by the government to chair the Task Force on Review of School Curriculum. She has discussed proposals to reform the Liberal Studies curriculum of the Hong Kong Diploma of Secondary Education (HKDSE), by replacing the scale of seven levels from Level 1 to Level 5** with pass/fail. She is a member of the prize selection panel of the Lui Che Woo Prize.

She was named an honorary fellow at the Education University of Hong Kong in recognition of her contributions to education.

References

External links
 St. Paul's Co-educational College

Year of birth missing (living people)
Living people
Hong Kong educators
Alumni of the University of Hong Kong
Alumni of the University of London
Monash University alumni